Robert Wheatley (born 17 January 1962) is a former Australian football player. He went on to make 9 appearances (5 'A' matches) for the Socceroos between 1981 and 1990. He was educated at Normanhurst Boys' High School in the north-western suburbs of Sydney.

References 

1962 births
Living people
Australian soccer players
Australia international soccer players
Blacktown City FC players
Marconi Stallions FC players
Bonnyrigg White Eagles FC players
Parramatta FC players
Association football defenders